Daisuke Muramatsu (born 8 June 1977) is a Japanese football manager who currently manages WE League club Albirex Niigata Ladies.

References 

Living people
1977 births
Japanese women's football managers
Association football people from Shizuoka Prefecture